{{Infobox military unit
|unit_name=West Virginia National Guard
|image= WVJFHQ.ashx.jpg
|image_size=220px
|caption=
|dates=1947 - present
|country= United States
|allegiance=  West Virginia
|branch= Joint
|type= Reserve forceMilitia
|role= 
|size=
|command_structure= West Virginia Department of Military Affairs and Public Safety
|garrison= Charleston, West Virginia
|garrison_label=
|nickname=
|motto="Mountaineers Are Free"
|march=
|mascot=
|battles=
|anniversaries=
|decorations=List of decorations

|commander1= President Joe Biden(Commander-in-Chief)Governor Jim Justice''(Governor of the State of West Virginia)
|commander1_label= Civilian leadership
|commander2= Major General William E. Crane(Adjutant General)
|commander2_label= State military leadership
|notable_commanders=

|identification_symbol= 
|identification_symbol_label= Unit insignia
|identification_symbol_2 = 
|identification_symbol_2_label = Seal of the West Virginia National Guard

}}
The West Virginia National Guard is a part of the West Virginia Department of Military Affairs and Public Safety. It comprises the West Virginia Army National Guard and the West Virginia Air National Guard. Unlike some states, West Virginia does not maintain a state defense force, nor is there a naval component to the state's military forces. 

 History 

The West Virginia National Guard traces its heritage to the 1735 militia company established in Berkeley County by Morgan Morgan. Originally formed for protection against Indian raids, militia units were quickly mobilized when necessary in war time. Militia units provided frontier service in the French and Indian War and during Dunmore’s War. Men from Western Virginia fought on all fronts in the Revolutionary War. During the War of 1812, Western Virginia militia units took part in the Northwest campaigns, and one company of Cabell County troops fought alongside Andrew Jackson at the Battle of New Orleans in 1815. Cabell, Berkeley, and Jefferson counties provided infantry regiments for service in the Mexican War of 1846-1848.

In 1861, Virginia decided to secede from the United States following the Battle of Fort Sumter. However, opposition to secession and slavery as well as anti-Confederate, Pro-Union sentiments were strong in Northwestern Virginia. The counties that now compose of present-day West Virginia voted to secede from Virginia and establish their own separate, pro-Union state, and the West Virginia National Guard's separate identity truly began to coalesce during this period. West Virginia provided some 40,000 men for service in both Northern and Southern forces. Many enlisted in the regiments of bordering states, especially Kentucky, Ohio, Pennsylvania, and Virginia. These troops primarily saw service on West Virginia soil or in the Valley of Virginia. Federal and Confederate units from West Virginia were present at both the first land battle of the war at Philippi and at the Confederate surrender at Appomattox.

A few ceremonial and social militia companies were formed after the Civil War, but the state did nothing to encourage their formation. Although violence during the Railroad Strike of 1877 led industrialists to plead for more militia companies, organization of the militia continued to be slow due to a lack of popular and legislative support. However, national labor problems and the formation of the National Guard Association as a lobbying group resulted in federal legislation that furnished funding and material for Guard companies. In 1889, the West Virginia legislature renamed the militia the West Virginia National Guard and provided state support. The First Infantry Regiment was organized in northern West Virginia and the Second Infantry Regiment in southern West Virginia.

In 1898, the two regiments were merged into one for service in the Spanish-American War. The First West Virginia Volunteer Infantry was stationed in Georgia. Later, another regiment was formed, the Second West Virginia Volunteer Infantry, which served in Pennsylvania during the war.

The militia or National Guard was activated for service in areas of labor unrest in 1877, 1880, 1894, 1902, and 1912. Though there were hundreds of strikes during this period, most were controlled by local police authorities. When this failed, troops were called to duty. The most prolonged service took place in 1902 when a national coal strike brought miners out in the New River Gorge, and in 1912–13 when miners struck for union recognition on Paint and Cabin creeks in Kanawha County. Martial law was declared for the strike zone in 1912, and miners and mine guards were sentenced to prison for various violations. ‘‘Mother’’ Jones was among those brought before the court-martial.

In 1916, the West Virginia National Guard was activated in response to President Woodrow Wilson’s call for troops to pursue Pancho Villa on the Mexican border. Again, the regiments were merged and the Second West Virginia Volunteer Infantry was sent to the border. After several months the unit returned home, only to be federalized within weeks for service in World War I. The Second Regiment and a newly recruited First Regiment were absorbed into the 38th Infantry Division. The Second Regiment was reorganized and redesignated as the 150th Infantry while the First Regiment was broken up into support units. The 150th Infantry landed in Europe at the end of the war and saw no action in that conflict.

One of the West Virginian National Guard's most infamous actions was when it took part in the Battle of Blair Mountain, the largest labor uprising in American history. It played a key role in the suppression of the labor revolt. 

Following World War I, the 150th and 201st Infantry Regiments were organized in southern and northern West Virginia, respectively. These units were federalized in January 1941 as President Franklin D. Roosevelt prepared the nation for war. The 150th spent World War II defending the Panama Canal while the 201st provided the first line of defense for the Aleutian Islands. The National Guard was dramatically changed after World War II. Artillery units, transportation, and engineering units were added to the 150th Infantry Regiment. Probably the biggest change, however, was the addition of a combat fighter squadron, bringing an important aviation component to the Guard

Since World War II, the Army and Air National Guard has served in a number of capacities, lending aid to West Virginians during natural disasters caused by periodic flooding and to victims of the coal refuse dam break on Buffalo Creek in 1972. As part of its military mission, elements of the West Virginia Army and Air National Guard were activated for duty during the Korean War, the war in Vietnam, the Gulf War of 1991, the Iraq War, in support of the peacekeeping mission to Bosnia in 1997–98, and more recent conflicts in Iraq and Afghanistan.

The West Virginia National Guard was mobilized more frequently after the attack on the World Trade Center on September 11, 2001, than at any other time in its history. Elements of the West Virginia Army and Air National Guard served in action in Afghanistan and in Iraq.

 Leadership 
The leadership of the West Virginia National Guard includes:
 Adjutant General: MG William E. Crane, WVARNG
 Director, Joint Staff: Brig Gen Michael O. Cadle, WVANG
 Senior Enlisted Leader: CSM James D. Jones, WVARNG
 Assistant Adjutant General for Army: BG Murray E. Holt II, WVARNG
 Command Sergeant Major: CSM Chadwick L. Moneypenny, WVANG
 Assistant Adjutant General for Air: Brig Gen David V. Cochran, WVANG
 Command Chief Master Sergeant: CMC David W. Stevens, WVANG

West Virginia Army National Guard

The West Virginia Army National Guard (WVARNG) is the United States Army component of the West Virginia National Guard. It has 38 units and activities stationed in 22 counties throughout West Virginia and overseas. The WV ARNG is supporting Homeland Security activities, and has deployed troops as part of Operation Iraqi Freedom in Iraq, Operation Enduring Freedom in  Afghanistan and the Horn of Africa, and peace keeping missions in Kosovo.

The WVARNG has a three-fold mission:
(a) Federal Mission: As a Reserve Component of the Army, maintain combat ready units and Soldiers who are available to mobilize in support of the U.S. National Military Strategy; 
(b) State Mission: Provide organized, trained and equipment units to protect life and property and to preserve peace, order and public safety when ordered by the governor; and 
(c) Community Mission: To add value to the communities in which we live, work and serve.

Current units

Army National Guard Element, Joint Force Headquarters West Virginia (JFHQ-WV), in Charleston
  111th Engineer Brigade, headquartered in Eleanor
  1092nd Engineer Battalion, headquartered in Parkersburg
 771st Troop Command Battalion, headquartered in Gassaway
 772nd Aviation Troop Command Battalion, headquartered in Williamstown
 77th Brigade Troop Command
  1st Squadron, 150th Cavalry Regiment, 30th Heavy Brigade Combat Team, headquartered at Bluefield
1st Battalion, 201st Field Artillery Regiment, 197th Field Artillery Brigade, headquartered at Fairmont
  2nd Battalion, 19th Special Forces Group (Airborne) HHD, SPT CO, C CO, DET-1, at Camp Dawson
 151st Military Police Battalion, headquartered in Gassaway
  Special Operations Detachment - Europe (SOD-E)
  197th Regiment (Regional Training Institute) at Camp Dawson
 35th Civil Support Team (WMD) in St. Albans
 Fixed Wing Army Aviation Training Site (FWAATS) in Bridgeport
 1528th Support Company (Special Operations)(Airborne) in Martinsburg

Two units of the West Virginia Army National Guard, the 150th Cavalry Regiment and the 201st Field Artillery Regiment, are among the nineteen Army National Guard units with campaign credit for the War of 1812. The 150th served with the 38th Infantry Division between the wars, served in the Panama Canal Zone during World War II, and was an armored cavalry regiment for a time after World War II.

West Virginia is also home to the 249th Army Band, stationed in Morgantown, WV. The band's history dates back to the turn of the century when it consisted of two bands, the 201st Infantry Band in Morgantown, WV and the 150th Infantry Band in Bluefield, WV. Upon release from federal service in World War Two, these two bands were consolidated into the current 249th and was stationed in Fairmont, West Virginia. In 1995, the 249th was stationed in Morgantown. The band is made up of members from throughout the state as well as surrounding states. These personnel make up a Concert Band, Ceremonial Band, Jazz Ensemble, Rock Band, and several other small ensembles including, but not limited to, a Brass Choir, Jazz Quartet, and Percussion Ensemble.

Located in Preston County, Camp Dawson is the main training site for the units of the West Virginia National Guard. Comprising over 4,000 acres, Camp Dawson has multiple ranges, training sites, and is home to Dawson Army Airfield (K3G5). The West Virginia Guard also hosts the Center for National Response at the Memorial Tunnel in Kanawha County.

It was reported on April 24, 2022, after the beginning of the 2022 Russian invasion of Ukraine, that West Virginia would be sending a number of M113 armored personnel carriers to Ukraine.

West Virginia Air National Guard

The West Virginia Air National Guard is the state's air force militia. It is part of both the United States Air Force and the West Virginia National Guard.

The West Virginia Air National Guard was officially federally recognized on March 7, 1947, as the 167th Fighter Squadron, based at Kanawha Airport in Charleston. During the early years of the 167th, it flew the T-6 Texan trainer, P-51 Mustang and P-47 Thunderbolt. The unit was activated October 10, 1950 during the Korean War, and was designated the 167th Fighter Bomber Squadron when it returned on July 10, 1952. In December 1955, the unit was redesignated as the 167th Fighter Interceptor Squadron''', and relocated to Eastern West Virginia Region Airport in Martinsburg, WV.

Today the West Virginia Air National Guard is composed of two airlift units, the 130th Airlift Wing based at Charleston Air National Guard Base in Charleston, West Virginia, and the 167th Airlift Wing based at Shepherd Field Air National Guard Base in Martinsburg, West Virginia. As of 2015, the 167th is flying the C-17 Globemaster III and the 130th is flying the C-130 Hercules in support of operations worldwide. In addition, the 130th and the 167th Wings took part in Operation Desert Shield. Both units report to Air Mobility Command.

130th Airlift Wing

On 13 May 2005, the Department of Defense released its Base Realignment and Closure, 2005 (BRAC) report, and the 130th Airlift Wing was one of the units slated to be eventually decommissioned. Its complement of eight C-130H aircraft would be realigned to Pope Air Force Base, and its complement of expeditionary combat support (ECS) personnel to the 167th Airlift Wing.

Upon learning of this, several former commanders of the 130th Airlift Wing along with members of the local Kanawha County Commission and the Yeager Airport Board of Directors formed the Keep 'Em Flying grassroots organization to try to prevent the unit from being decommissioned.  Following an outpouring of community support, money was raised for newspaper ads and radio ads, and to hire analysts familiar with BRAC, all in an attempt to save the unit. On June 13, 2005, members of the BRAC commission came to Charleston to evaluate the base and talk to General Tackett, Governor Joe Manchin, Senator Robert Byrd, Congresswoman Shelley Moore Capito and Col. Bill Peters, Jr., former commander of the 130th and chair for Keep 'Em Flying.

Following this visit, and taking in all the information that was presented to them during that time, the BRAC commission voted unanimously, 9–0, to keep the unit intact.

167th Airlift Wing

Since the September 11 attacks on New York City and Washington, D.C., the unit has had members deployed to the Afghan and Iraq wars. Unit members have received six Bronze Stars and two Purple Hearts in support of these operations. In December 2006, the 167th received its first C-5 Galaxy, out of a total of 11 aircraft. In February 2012, the Force Structure Overview was released by the Secretary of the Air Force. The document detailed numerous aircraft changes throughout the active, Guard and Reserve forces, including the replacement of the unit's C-5 aircraft with C-17s. On September 25, 2014, the 167th Airlift Wing flew its final C-5 mission, a local training sortie. That same day the wing received its first C-17 Globemaster III aircraft, one of eight C-17s the unit is slated to receive.

Awards and decorations 
List of decorations awarded by the West Virginia National Guard

In popular culture 

 The 2020 military fiction novel, Assault by Fire, by H. Ripley Rawlings, prominently features the West Virginia National Guard holding back a Russian attack on the U.S.

References 

  - mention of many deployed at WVU Medicine J.W. Ruby Memorial Hospital.

External links

 West Virginia National Guard Home Page
 Department of Military Affairs and Public Safety
 West Virginia Army Guard Home Page
West Virginia Air National Guard
Bibliography of West Virginia Army National Guard History compiled by the United States Army Center of Military History
West Virginia National Guard: 1898 - 1919 Pictorial History Book
753rd EOD CO, WV-ARNG An Explosive Ordnance Disposal unit.
Camp Dawson, near Kingwood, WV

 
National Guard (United States)
Military in West Virginia
State agencies of West Virginia